New Taipei City Constituency I includes districts along the northwestern coast of New Taipei City. The district was formerly known as Taipei County Constituency I (2008-2010) and acquired its present boundaries since 2008, when all local constituencies of the Legislative Yuan were reorganized to become single-member districts.

Current district
 Shimen
 Sanzhi
 Tamsui
 Bali
 Linkou

Legislators

Election results

Notes

Words in native languages 

2008 establishments in Taiwan
Constituencies in New Taipei